The 1981 Tulsa Golden Hurricane football team represented the University of Tulsa during the 1981 NCAA Division I-A football season. In their fifth year under head coach John Cooper, the Golden Hurricane compiled a 6–5 record (5–1 against conference opponents) and tied for the Missouri Valley Conference championship.

The team's statistical leaders included quarterback Kenny Jackson with 806 passing yards, Brett White with 640 rushing yards, and John Green with 252 receiving yards. Head coach John Cooper was later inducted into the College Football Hall of Fame.

Schedule

References

Tulsa
Tulsa Golden Hurricane football seasons
Missouri Valley Conference football champion seasons
Tulsa Golden Hurricane football